This is a bar graph showing a timeline of aircraft carriers of the United States Navy displaying the ships' names and their hull numbers.

Notes
The carriers are listed in order of hull number.
Ships with hull numbers 35, 44, 46, and 50 through 58 were cancelled or never commissioned and are not shown.
While the chart does include light carriers, it does not include amphibious assault ships nor escort carriers with the exception of the Langley which is included for historical context.  
In general, labels for ships of a single class are aligned vertically with the topmost ship in a column carrying the class name.
In an attempt to show the full timeline of the actual existence of each ship, the final dates on each bar may variously be the date struck, sold, scrapped, scuttled, sunk as a reef, etc., as appropriate to show last time it existed as a floating object.

Timeline

See also
 Aircraft carrier
 Timeline for aircraft carrier service
 List of United States Navy escort aircraft carriers
 Timeline of battleships of the United States Navy

References

External links
Dictionary of American Naval Fighting Ships
MaritimeQuest US Aircraft Carrier Index
 The Lost American Aircraftcarriers

 
United States
Aircraft carriers